The Genauni (Gaulish: *Genaunoi, earlier *Gēnomnoi, 'the natives') or Genaunes were a Gallic tribe dwelling in the eastern valley of the Inn river, in Tyrol, during the Iron Age and the Roman period.

Name 
They are mentioned as Genaunos by Horace (1st c. BC), as Genaúnōn (Γεναύνων) by Strabo (early 1st c. AD), and as Genaunes by Pliny (1st c. AD).

The ethnic name Genauni is a latinized form of Gaulish *Genaunoi (sing. Genaunos), which can be translated 'the natives'. It stems from an earlier form *Géno-mnoi, based on the stem gen(o)- ('descendants, family').

Geography 
The Genauni lived in the eastern valley of the Inn river, in Raetia. Their territory was located north of the Focunates, east of the Breuni, south of the Estiones, Licates and Cosuanetes, west of the Vennones.

History 
They are mentioned by Pliny the Elder as one of the Alpine tribes conquered by Rome in 16–15 BC, and whose name was engraved on the Tropaeum Alpium.

References

Primary sources

Bibliography 

Historical Celtic peoples
Gauls